Tomáš Vorobjov (born 1984) is a Slovak amateur astronomer and an observer and discoverer of minor planets, in particular near-Earth objects.

He is the director of the IASC Data Reduction Team and is credited by the Minor Planet Center with the discovery of 9 numbered minor planets.

In October 2012, Vorobjov discovered 276P/Vorobjov, a periodic comet and his first comet discovery. He also discovered the trans-Neptunian object (TNO)  in April 2012.

The Florian main-belt asteroid 4858 Vorobjov, discovered by American astronomer James Gibson at Palomar in 1985, was named after him.

Discoveries

Near-Earth objects  

 2011 EB7 (Mar 1, 2011) 
 2011 HD63 (May 1, 2011) 
 2011 PW6 (Aug 8, 2011) 
 2013 EP41 (Mar 9, 2013) 
 2013 FC11 (Mar 21, 2013) 
 2014 FG33 (Mar 26, 2014) 
 2014 GF45 (Apr 6, 2014) 
 2014 QP362 (Aug 26, 2014) 
 2014 WG70 (Nov 17, 2014)

Centaurs 
 2013 GY54 (Mar 8, 2013) 
 2015 FK37 (Mar 20, 2015)

TNOs 

 (432949) 2012 HH2 (Apr 19, 2012)
 2014 FP43 (Mar 28, 2014)
 2014 GE45 (Apr 6, 2014)
 2014 QF433 (Aug 26, 2014)
 2014 UH192 (Oct 28, 2014)
 2014 WT69 (Nov 17, 2014)
 TVPS8GA (Nov 20, 2014) - lost
 2015 FP36 (Mar 19, 2015)

References 
 

1984 births
Discoverers of asteroids
Discoverers of comets

Living people
Slovak astronomers